Natalija Paulauskaitė (born 27 September 1991) is a Lithuanian biathlete. She competed in the 2014/15 World Cup seasons, and represented Lithuania at the Biathlon World Championships 2015 in Kontiolahti.

References

External links 
 

1991 births
Living people
Lithuanian female biathletes